Sarah Orban is a Canadian professional racing cyclist. She rode in the women's sprint event at the 2020 UCI Track Cycling World Championships in Berlin, Germany.

References

Year of birth missing (living people)
Living people
Canadian female cyclists
Place of birth missing (living people)
21st-century Canadian women
Cyclists at the 2022 Commonwealth Games
Commonwealth Games competitors for Canada
Commonwealth Games silver medallists for Canada
Commonwealth Games medallists in cycling
Medallists at the 2022 Commonwealth Games